Maa Balaji is a 1999 Indian Telugu-language comedy drama film directed by Kodi Ramakrishna. The film stars Vadde Naveen, Maheswari, and Laya. It is produced by S. Gopal Reddy on Bhargav Art Productions. The music was composed by Vandemataram Srinivas. The film released on 23 September 1999 and was commercially successful. It is a remake of the Malayalam film Punjabi House (1998).

Plot 
Balaji is a young and ambitious man. But he is unsuccessful in his trials to make money and ends up in debt of 10 lakh. Unable to repay the amount, he jumps off into the sea to commit suicide after insuring an amount of 10 lakh for his debtors with the LIC. However, he is saved and lands up in the house of a rich Punjabi man Balwinder Singh whose mute daughter Pooja falls in love with him.

Cast

Music 
Music was composed by Vandemataram Srinivas. The lyrics were written by Sirivennela Sitarama Sastry and Bhuvana Chandra.

Reception 
Jeevi of Idlebrain.com rated the film 4 out of 5 and noted, “First half is in lighter vein and second half is very gripping. Climax is the heart and soul of the film”. Griddaluru Gopala Rao of Zamin Ryot gave the film a negative review criticising the story, characterisations, dialogues and direction as clichéd, and artificial.

References

External links 
 
 Maa Balaji at JioCinema
 Maa Balaji at Amazon Prime Video

1990s Telugu-language films
1999 comedy-drama films
1999 films
Films directed by Kodi Ramakrishna
Films scored by Vandemataram Srinivas
Indian comedy-drama films
Telugu remakes of Malayalam films